Eric Northman is a fictional character in The Southern Vampire Mysteries, a series of thirteen books written by New York Times bestselling author Charlaine Harris.  He is a vampire, slightly over one thousand years old, and is first introduced in the first novel, Dead Until Dark and appears in all subsequent novels. Since the book series is told from the first person perspective of Sookie Stackhouse, what readers perceive of his character is influenced by what Sookie comprehends. HBO's television series True Blood is based on this book series and the character of Eric Northman is portrayed somewhat differently. A list of True Blood characters has a detailed description of Eric's character from the TV show.

Human life 
In the early books, little was revealed about his past. In the ninth book, Dead and Gone Eric revealed details about his human life as a Viking. He was deemed a man at the age of twelve. At sixteen he married Aude, his brother's widow. The couple had six children, but only three were living at the time of his turning, two boys and a girl. Aude and their sixth child died of a fever shortly after the birth when Eric was in his early twenties. It is revealed in the television series that the vampire king of Mississippi murdered his entire family before stealing his father's Viking crown. In the books, he was ambushed one night by a Roman vampire named Appius Livius Ocella and subsequently turned. In the television series, he was made a vampire by Godric. In the television show, it is also shown that Eric was a Viking prince, in the novels Eric says that his father was a chief. The name "Eric" or "Erik" comes from Old Norse and means "One ruler" or "eternal ruler". The name "Norseman" was the name given to people who could speak the Old Norse Language, spoken in the Scandinavian countries, namely Sweden, Norway and Denmark. The name "Norseman" means "man from the north", hence Eric's last name being Northman.

Physical description and personality 

In the first novel, Dead Until Dark, Sookie Stackhouse thinks Eric Northman is a "hunk." Sookie describes him as “handsome, in fact, radiant; blond and blue-eyed, tall and broad shouldered. He was wearing boots, jeans, and a vest. Period. Kind of like the guys on the cover of romance books". He's approximately six-foot-four. When Sookie sees him naked for the first time in Dead to the World, she thinks, “if there were an international butt competition, Eric would win, hands down – or cheeks up.”
In the TV series 'True Blood' he is tall with long blonde hair. By the end of the first season, and a little bit into the second, Pam (his progeny) cuts his hair shorter than expected because he gets blood in it. Eric is always shown in dark blue jeans with a black singlet and a black leather jacket. When his hair is cut shorter, he parts it and combs it diagonally backwards. His personality in the series is mostly the same, Eric Northman is ruthless and does not care much for human life. His relationship with his progeny, Pam, is where you see this softer side of him come through. When they face difficult challenges and situations, Eric would put her needs above his own. By the middle of season 2 Eric begins to pursue Sookie Stackhouse because of his interest in her abilities, and by the end of season 2 Eric Northman has cunningly tricked her into drinking his blood. Near the beginning of the third season, it is implied that he is beginning to develop feelings for her, even helping her when it is disadvantageous for him to do so.

Eric is portrayed in the books as being somewhat arrogant, but having a true joie de vivre. He is confident almost to a fault, once reprimanding a thug in the third book, Club Dead, for threatening Sookie and referring to her as his "future lover" although no potentially romantic relationship  between Eric and Sookie yet existed. He can be manipulative to suit his needs. He is not above using deceit though it seems to be a last resort when it comes to Sookie. However, he is typically upfront regarding any action he takes and if he is manipulative he is very frank and open regarding his wishes. Due to his frank nature, Sookie comments to herself how she can always know where she stands with Eric. Indeed, Sookie frequently remarks how conversations with Eric are seldom single layered and how he never says something without reason. He is not sentimental in the least but shows a great deal of concern over Sookie and her happiness and well-being, perhaps making the relationship between Eric and Sookie all the more impressive.
Sookie believes that, although Eric has created a modest, but thriving business empire and carved out a position of authority in the delicate vampire hierarchy, at heart he remains a born-Viking warrior, ready to leap into battle at any instant.

Work and position within the vampire hierarchy 

The vampires in Charlaine Harris' world are organized according to a feudal system with each state divided into "Areas", each of which are governed by a sheriff who then owes allegiance to the queen or king of that particular state. Some states, like California, are so large and so heavily populated with humans (and therefore vampires who prey on humans) they are divided into multiple kingdoms. For example, what humans see as California, vampires see as California Sacramento, California San Jose, and California Los Angeles. Louisiana is not such a state and is ruled by one monarch. However, it is possible for a monarch to control multiple states. At one point in the series Louisiana is controlled by the same vampire who also controlled Arkansas. Later in the series a different ruler controls Louisiana, Arkansas, and Nevada.

Eric is the most powerful vampire in Area Five of northern Louisiana: a territory that includes the small town of Bon Temps.  Eric serves as Sheriff of area 5, or local boss, of that area and owns a vampire bar in Shreveport called "Fangtasia," that also serves as his headquarters. He runs the bar with the help of his vampire progeny Pam and a few of his underlings, or vampires who owe allegiance to Eric as their sheriff. Eric takes his responsibilities and role within the vampire hierarchy very seriously.  In the sixth novel, Definitely Dead, Eric mentions that he has paid a significant fine to the arbitrator for killing a former Fangtasia bartender, Long Shadow. This demonstrates that he did not hide his crime, as killing another vampire is a "serious thing.". Precisely what a Vampire Sheriff does, aside from owe allegiance to their monarch, do their monarch's bidding, and rule their Area, is still somewhat unclear. Sookie makes a conscious effort not to pry too hard into vampire affairs and Eric does nothing to encourage her learning much more than she already knows. Eric surprised Sookie in the tenth book, Dead in the Family, when he explained the vampire hierarchy in more detail, simply so she, as his wife according to vampire law, was better informed for her safety.

The state of Louisiana was in disarray after the results of Hurricane Katrina, and after queen of Louisiana, Eric's hierarch, was crippled in an explosion and eventually killed by the vampires of Nevada under Felipe de Castro's order. Eric was spared since he was the most practical of the Sheriffs and had one of the largest money makers, Bill Compton, living in his area and owing fealty to him. As the last surviving sheriff of Louisiana, Eric pledges his allegiance to the new regime in order to protect those under him, a tactical move that highlights his capabilities both as a leader and a political survivor. Had Eric resisted, he and all of the vampires serving under him (possibly with the exception of Bill) would have been killed, including Sookie.  After accepting the new King, Felipe de Castro, he is then allowed to maintain control of his area and his followers when the other sheriffs of Louisiana and a number of their minions were all killed. Under the new regime, Eric has spent a significant amount of time acclimating himself to his new overlords. Despite his oath, however, Eric remains ever vigilant for opportunities to either further secure his position or free himself entirely from scrutiny of Felipe's Louisiana representative, Victor.

Relationship with Sookie Stackhouse 
The author introduces Sookie to Eric in her first novel, Dead Until Dark.  Eric then appears in all the subsequent novels and has either saved or attempted to save Sookie's life in every book. From the second book onward, Eric and Sookie share at least one intimate moment together per book. In the second one there are several: when he asks her to suck out a bullet in his chest that he took for her, and when Sookie invites him to an orgy they have to play the part; in the third, they almost have sex before being interrupted by Bubba and also when he gives her blood after she is staked; the fourth, they experience a sexual relationship when he is cursed with amnesia, which he forgets all about promptly after being un-cursed; the fifth, they kiss; the sixth, during battle Eric sneaks a kiss on Sookie after saving her; the seventh, they exchange blood tying them to each other in a blood bond and Eric kisses her; the eighth, they kiss again after Eric smells fairy blood all over Sookie; and in the ninth, they consummate their relationship after being wed by vampire laws and seem to be moving in the direction of an official relationship. In the later books, she has also saved his life several times before.

After appearing to develop an affection for Sookie in the third book in the series, Club Dead, Eric has a brief romance with her in Dead to the World, the fourth book, though, due to a curse, he lost his memories of that time until From Dead to Worse, the eighth book. In the eighth book, after sitting in Sookie's room, he reveals that he remembers the days he spent with her when the curse was put on him. He asks her to discuss it, and she refuses. He seemingly likes Bill Compton but feels arrogantly competitive in an emotional battle for Sookie's affections.

In the seventh book, All Together Dead, when Sookie is accosted into forming a blood bond with Andre, another powerful vampire, Eric steps in opportunistically as the lesser of two evils and bonds with her himself. A blood bond is formed when a human and vampire exchange blood by drinking it from them. Vampire blood can heal any human wounds within seconds as can human blood do the same for vampires.

In Dead and Gone, Eric sends Sookie a velvet parcel that he instructs her to give to him in front of King Felipe de Castro's representative, Victor Madden.  Without looking inside the parcel first, Sookie presents Eric the bag which contains a ceremonial knife that is used in marriage ceremonies. The king's representative reveals that the act of giving and receiving the knife means that Eric and Sookie are pledged to one another. Eric claims that he deceived Sookie because the King of Nevada had the power and desire to take her away from her home.  Because they are wed, Eric is the only vampire that can have access to Sookie on pain of final death. He also reveals that the curse that had been placed on him made him unconsciously seek out the presence of his heart's desire (Sookie). In "Dead in the Family" Eric and Sookie are in an actual relationship, and Eric admits that he sees Sookie as his wife in the only way that matters to him, which left her puzzled.

In the 12th Sookie Stackhouse novel, Deadlocked, Sookie and Eric's relationship takes a turn. Eric was promised by his maker, Appius, to marry the Queen of Oklahoma, and he has spent much of his time figuring out how to get out of the promise. Sookie wants Eric to choose her outright and Eric explains that he just can't ignore a command from his maker even though he is dead. They do not see each other too much in the book; Eric does tell Sookie that she has the power to make him stay, which she finds out near the end of the book that he knows about her cluviel dor which will grant her one wish. She ends up using it at the end of the book to save Sam Merlotte's life and Eric just walks away after he sees this. The book ends with them basically in the same spot, not knowing if Eric is going to marry the Queen of Oklahoma or stay with Sookie.

In the 13th Sookie Stackhouse novel, Dead Ever After, Eric and Sookie's relationship has crashed and burned. Eric is set to officially marry Freyda, the Queen of Oklahoma, and he has been banned from ever seeing Sookie again. Also, Sookie has been banned from Fangtasia and Oklahoma. In one of the last conversations Eric and Sookie have, he tells her that he was considering making her a vampire even though she never wanted to become one. By the end of the novel, Eric is in Oklahoma with his new wife and without either of his progeny.

Television portrayal 
In True Blood, an HBO series based on the earliest books in the series, the character of Eric Northman is played by Swedish actor Alexander Skarsgård. Some details of the character are portrayed somewhat differently on True Blood than in the books. In the series, Eric is created by Godric, with whom he shares a deep bond of loyalty and devotion. In season 2 Godric commits suicide by exposing himself to sunlight, causing Eric to shed bloody vampire tears, however, in the novels he cries for the first time in book 9. In the series, Bill, rather than Eric, saves Sookie from Long Shadow (in the books Eric kills him). Eric has not demonstrated the outward concern for Sookie that he exhibited in the early novels, but he appears to be developing an uneasy, guarded affection for her and the series seems to portray a reluctance on his part to show people, particularly Sookie, his genuine emotions. Often Eric has presented himself to Sookie as violent, arrogant, mischievous and consciously manipulative. Thus far in the series he has usually acted in a manner with little apparent concern for Sookie's feelings or immediate safety, although ultimately he seems to protect her.

However, his growing feelings for Sookie are showcased in episode 4 of Season 3 when he daydreams about Sookie. After the daydream he spurns Yvetta and Pam looks on at him concerned. In episode 10, Eric kissed Sookie, after proclaiming that if he were to die a true death without having at least kissed her, that would be his greatest regret. He chained her up in his basement a few minutes later as bait for Russell. He again reveals his guarded affection for her when prompted by Russell to drink her blood, he hesitates and strokes her affectionately on the cheek. Finally, in the season three finale, he tells her that he regrets seeing her in such pain, referring to her heartbreak over ending her relationship with Bill- although he was the one who deliberately gave her the information that caused her to banish Bill from her house.

Eric's back story is more deeply explored in Season 3, as his youth and human life as a Viking prince was shown; his family was slaughtered in their castle by a pack of werewolves, under the command of the ancient vampire Russell Edgington.  Eric gave his dying father a vow to avenge them all.  During World War II, he and Godric were shown tracking Russell's wolfpack across Germany disguised as SS officers, though they never found Russell himself.

In Season 3, when Eric defects to Russell Edginton (now the King of Mississippi) instead of Queen Sophie-Anne in an effort to save Pam from torture by the Magister, he notices a crown in Russell's antique collection that he recognizes as his father's, stolen the night of the attack. Realizing Russell is the target he has sought for over 1,000 years, he continues to play up his loyalty to Russell to keep him from becoming suspicious, even displaying callous indifference to Sookie when she is captured and asks for help.  However, later on, when Russell is attacking Bill and Sookie with his wolves, Eric murders his progeny and husband Talbot; Russell, sensing Talbot's death, is driven insane by grief and rage.  He hunts down Eric and prepares to kill him until Eric reveals that he can show Russell how to daywalk, Russell's oldest obsession.  After consuming much of Sookie's blood against her will (which visibly discomforts Eric) they are indeed able to daywalk, but it wears off very quickly; Eric cuffs Russell to himself with silver, intending for both of them to burn.  Sookie brings Eric back inside and, at the request of Eric, retrieves the badly-injured Russell as well.  Eric only spared Russell because he thought death would be too merciful for him; after knocking out one of his fangs, he buried the crippled vampire in silver chains and wet concrete, intending to let him starve in agony for 100 years but never die.

In Season 4, we see the relationship of Sookie and Eric develop after he loses his memory to the witch coven; first, Sookie shelters him in her house from Bill (though the house is technically Eric's).  Endeared by the new Eric's innocence and his regret over his previous crimes as a vampire, Sookie eventually enters a sexual relationship with him, though in the Season 4 finale, Sookie is choosing between Eric and Bill, and chooses neither. Sources have said of Season 5 that Sookie's "independent streak" will continue (as Alan Ball, executive producer) claimed in an interview concerning the upcoming season. By the end of the season, Eric has regained his memories, though he retains his memory and part of the gentler personality he had when he was with Sookie.

In Season Five, after previously killing Nan Flanagan, Eric and Bill are arrested by the Vampire Authority. However, Nora, Eric's 'sister' (with whom he also has a sexual history) rescues them. Later, all three are caught by the Authority. While Eric steers clear of the Sanguinista movement stirring in the authority and attempts to escape, Bill accepts the Book of Lilith and betrays him. Eric manages to successfully escape with Nora and searches for Sookie to enlist her help; in the process, he manages to kill his archenemy Russell Edgington, fulfilling a vengeance that he began when he was still human.  He attempts to save Bill but apparently fails.  Later, he returns Sookie's house to her for her protection; while she is grateful to him and considers him a friend, she still banishes him from the house, and Eric tells Nora they will stay away from her now.

In Season 6, Eric finds his latest threat to be the humans, especially Governor Truman Burrell, who declares war on vampires. In an effort to challenge the Governor's stance on vampires, Eric turns Willa Burrell, Truman's more open-minded daughter after noticing her selflessness of willingly dying for a cause similar to Nora. Regardless, the Governor has them both placed in "Vamp Camp", where Eric is later forced to helplessly watch his sister, Nora, receive a lethal injection of "Hep V".  Eric uses Willa to escape the camp (promising to get her and Pam out), but she also demands he frees Jessica & Tara as well and takes Nora to the Lilith-enhanced Bill, but they are unable to save her. Devastated by her death, Eric violently slaughters the humans running the concentration camp to seek revenge and free both his progenies, among others.  Notably, Eric spares Jason Stackhouse, though he kills the vampire Steve Newlin, stating "Every time I lost someone I loved, you were there." (Blaming him for the deaths of Godric & Nora), After freeing the imprisoned vampires, Eric flies off to grieve his sister Nora's death in solitude. In the finale, Warlow, the fairy-vampire hybrid whose blood made it possible for Eric and the other vampires to walk in the sun, is killed by Jason to save Sookie. When Warlow dies, the effects of his blood wears off in the vampires who drank it and they are no longer able to walk in the sun. Eric is shown in the sun on a mountain top in Åre, Sweden when Warlow's blood wears off, causing Eric to burn.

In Season 7, Pam tracks down Eric, who somehow avoided meeting the true death.  However, he has been infected with the Hepatitis V virus.
After learning that Sarah Newlin is still alive, he and Pam decide to go after her.  Eric and Pam soon learn that Newlin drank the antidote and it permeated her body, making Sarah a living antidote for Hep V.  They are forced to work with Yakuza ninjas from the Yakanomo Corporation (the company which originally made True Blood) in order to find her, but neither party trusts the other.  Upon capturing Sarah, Eric drinks her blood and rids himself of the Hep V virus, then the Yakuza suggest they make New Blood, but ensure it doesn't work too well, so Vampires can buy more and increase the profit, and want Eric to be the face of New Blood. Learning that Bill is dying, Eric secretly reveals the cure (contrary to the Yakuza's wishes) to Sookie and offers to heal Bill, despite their long rivalry; he is stunned when Bill refuses.  However, after talking with Bill he understands his motives and tells Sookie to talk with him, making his final peace with both Bill and Sookie.  Eric  suggests to Pam, they let Sarah free, so the Yakuza members don't get her, murder them all and collect all the profit, much to her delight, and they proceed to do all of it, and by the end of the series, they are running a multibillion-dollar corporation called New Blood, derived from Sarah Newlin's blood, which is both a new vampire food source and a universal cure for Hep V. Eric and Pam tell the world that Sarah got away from them, but they found a drop of her blood to make New Blood with, and thereby save every infected vampire in the world. In actuality, they are keeping Sarah chained in the basement at Fangtasia, and charging vampires small fortunes to feed on her, as she slowly goes insane. All the while, Eric sits on his throne on the Fangtasia stage, relishing his accomplishments.

Origin 
Eric is frequently referred to as a Viking. In episode 4 of season 3 of True Blood, Eric says he played by the North Sea as a child. In episode 10 of season 3, Pam alludes to Eric being Swedish when she says, "I have no interest in inheriting your farm on Öland.  That place is a windy shit-hole". Eric also speaks Swedish with Pam and Godric in some episodes.

We have seen a flashback of the time before Pam's turning, which was portrayed differently in True Blood than in the books. In the television series, Pam slits her own wrists after Eric denies her request to be turned, forcing him to do it to save her life. In the books, it is said that Eric offered her immortality.

References 

Fictional characters who can move at superhuman speeds
Fictional characters with accelerated healing
Fictional characters with superhuman durability or invulnerability
Fictional characters with superhuman strength
Fictional vampires
Fictional Vikings
Fictional World War II veterans
Fictional Swedish people
Fictional businesspeople
Fictional sheriffs
Fictional LGBT characters in television
Fictional LGBT men
Fictional pansexuals
Literary characters introduced in 2001
The Southern Vampire Mysteries characters